Smithfield Farm is a historic plantation house and farm located near Berryville, Clarke County, Virginia, United States. The manor house was completed in 1824, and is a two-story, five-bay, brick dwelling in the Federal style. It has a low-hipped roof and front and rear porticos. Also on the property are a schoolteacher's residence and a combination farm office and a summer kitchen, each with stepped parapet faҫades. Also on the property are the contributing large brick bank barn (1822), a brick equipment shed, a slave quarters, and a stone stable, all built around 1820, and a wooden barn (c. 1830).

It was listed on the National Register of Historic Places in 2001. Presently the house is a popular bed & breakfast, and home to organic farmer and New York Times best-selling author Forrest Pritchard, son of Ruth Smith Pritchard, owner of the bed and breakfast and a direct descendant of the original owners of Smithfield.

References

Plantation houses in Virginia
Houses on the National Register of Historic Places in Virginia
Farms on the National Register of Historic Places in Virginia
National Register of Historic Places in Clarke County, Virginia
Federal architecture in Virginia
Houses completed in 1824
Houses in Clarke County, Virginia
Slave cabins and quarters in the United States